Janicke Gunvaldsen (born 19 May 1981) is a Norwegian professional racing cyclist who rides for Team Hitec Products.

See also
 List of 2016 UCI Women's Teams and riders

References

External links
 

1981 births
Living people
Norwegian female cyclists
Place of birth missing (living people)